El Franco Lee (January30, 1949January3, 2016) was an American politician who served as a Harris County commissioner from 1985 to his death in 2016. Before becoming a county commissioner, he served as a member of the Texas House of Representatives from 1979 to 1985.

Early life
Lee was born in Houston, Texas, on January 30, 1949, to Robert and Selma Lee. He had one younger sibling and three older siblings. After graduating from Phillis Wheatley High School, Lee earned a Bachelor of Science from Texas Southern University.

Career

Texas House of Representatives
Lee ran for office in the 88th district of the Texas House of Representatives in 1978. The 88th district was being vacated by Mickey Leland, under whom Lee served as an aide for six years. Lee, who was endorsed by the United Steelworkers, was initially disqualified from the ballot due to having an insufficient number of verifiable signatures for his nominating petition. After a ruling by district judge Jim Wallace, Lee was allowed to remain on the ballot after paying a $400 fee. He defeated Norma Watson in the Democratic primary after a runoff election. Lee, who was running unopposed, won the general election in November.

During his tenure as a state legislator, Lee served on the Business and Industry, Intergovernmental Affairs, Ways and Means, Environmental Affairs, and Elections committees.

Harris County Commissioner
In January 1984, Lee announced he would not seek re-election to the Texas House and instead seek the position of Harris County Commissioner, Precinct 1. Lee's primary challengers included Carl Walker Jr. and Sylvester Turner. Lee defeated Walker after a runoff election. Because the Republican Republican Party did not field any candidates for the position, Lee's victory in the runoff ensured him of the post. As a result, Lee became the first African-American member of Harris County's governing body.

Lee served in this position for over 30 years until his death in 2016.

Death
Lee died of a myocardial infarction on January 3, 2016, at Lyndon B. Johnson General Hospital, in Houston, Texas.

Legacy

In 1990, the local communities around Hall Road Park in Houston successfully petitioned to rename the park as El Franco Lee Park. In May 2009, the Harris County Hospital District opened the El Franco Lee Health Center in Alief, Houston.

References

1949 births
Texas Southern University alumni
Democratic Party members of the Texas House of Representatives
African-American state legislators in Texas
2016 deaths
County commissioners in Texas
Politicians from Houston
20th-century African-American people
21st-century African-American people